The Men's slalom competition at the FIS Alpine World Ski Championships 2019 was held on 17 February 2019. A qualification was held on 16 February 2019.

Results

Final
Run 1 was started at 11:00 and the final run at 14:30.

Qualification

References

Men's slalom